This is a list of Bulgarian football transfers for the 2013–14 winter transfer window. Only transfers involving a team from the A PFG and B PFG are listed. The window will close at midnight on 28 February 2014. Players without a club may join one at any time, either during or in between transfer windows.

A PFG

Beroe

In:

Out:

Botev Plovdiv

In:

Out:

Cherno More

In:

Out:

Chernomorets Burgas

In:

Out:

CSKA Sofia

In:
 

Out:

Levski Sofia

In:

Out:

Litex Lovech

In:

Out:

Lokomotiv Plovdiv

In:

Out:

Lokomotiv Sofia

In:
 

Out:

Ludogorets Razgrad

In:

Out:

Lyubimets 2007

In:

Out:

Neftochimic Burgas

In:

Out:

Pirin Gotse Delchev

In:

Out:

Slavia Sofia

In:

Out:

B PFG

Akademik Svishtov

In:

Out:

Bansko

In:

Out:

Botev Galabovo

In:

Out:

Botev Vratsa

In:

Out:

Dobrudzha

In:

Out:

Dunav 2010

In:

Out:

Haskovo 2009

In:

Out:

Kaliakra

In:

Out:

Marek 2010

In:

Out:

Montana

In:

Out:

Pirin Razlog

In:

Out:

Rakovski 2011

In:

Out:

Spartak Varna

In:

Out:

Vitosha Bistritsa

In:

Out:

References

Bulgaria
Winter 2013-14